Stukalov is a Russian masculine surname, its feminine counterpart is Stukalova. It may refer to:

Anatoli Stukalov (born 1991), Russian football player
Boris Stukalov (born 1953), Russian football manager and a former player
Darya Stukalova (born 1994), Russian Paralympic swimmer
Dmitry Stukalov (born 1951), Russian hurdler 
Nikolai Pogodin, pen name of the Soviet playwright Nikolai Stukalov (1900–1962)

Russian-language surnames